Josh Renton (born 25 May 1994) is a New Zealand rugby union player who currently plays as a halfback for Valorugby Emilia in Italian Top10.

Early career

Born and raised in the southern New Zealand town of Dunedin, Renton attended the prestigious Otago Boys' High School in his hometown where he played first XV rugby, captaining the side in his senior year.

Senior career

Renton started out his senior career with his local ITM Cup side Otago, debuting during the 2013 season against local rivals  while largely serving as back up to experienced Japanese halfback Fumiaki Tanaka throughout his first year of provincial rugby. Tanaka's return to Japan to play Top League rugby with the Panasonic Wild Knights in 2014 saw Renton become first choice number 9 for the Razorbacks. Renton missed the entire campaign as a result of a knee injury picked up playing club rugby earlier in the year.

In 2021 he come back in New Zealand to play for Southland Stags in New Zealand NPC.

Super Rugby

Strong showings for Otago in domestic rugby through 2013 and 2014 were rewarded when Dunedin-based Super Rugby franchise, the  named him in their wider training group for the 2015 Super Rugby season.   Serving as back up to All Black Aaron Smith and Japanese international Fumiaki Tanaka, Renton was limited to just a solitary substitute appearance in his first season with the Highlanders.   He was however promoted to the franchise's senior squad for 2016 at the expense of Tanaka, but, injury ended his campaign early after just 3 appearances from the replacements bench.   Despite his injury problems, new Highlanders head coach, Tony Brown retained him in the squad for 2017.

Pro 14
Renton played for Italian Pro14 team Zebre from 2018 to 2021.

International career

Renton represented New Zealand Schools in 2012 and was a member of the New Zealand Under-20 side which finished 3rd in the 2014 IRB Junior World Championship in his home country, scoring 2 tries in 5 matches.

Career Honours

Highlanders

Super Rugby - 2015

Super Rugby statistics

References

1994 births
Living people
New Zealand rugby union players
Rugby union scrum-halves
Otago rugby union players
Highlanders (rugby union) players
Rugby union players from Dunedin
People educated at Otago Boys' High School
Zebre Parma players
Southland rugby union players